The Carlo F. Dondena Centre for Research on Social Dynamics was established at Bocconi University in 2006. It aims to promote, coordinate and conduct interdisciplinary research on social dynamics, with emphasis on medium- and long-term processes and on comparative analysis.

Areas of interest
Researchers involved in the Centre include demographers, economists, experts in law, political scientists, social psychologists, and statisticians.

The main areas of interest of the Centre are:
demography and the life course, e.g. 
fertility and family dynamics
intergenerational relationships and ageing
transitions to adulthood
migration
lifelong learning
social networks
medium- and long-range forecasting
labour market 
social mobility
development and social cohesion, e.g. 
inequality
social norms and economic development
polarization
integration of migrants and second generations
welfare state and public policies, e.g. 
social policies in comparative perspective
Europeanisation and regional issues
data collection and harmonisation, including creation of a data archive.

Bocconi University
Research institutes in Italy
Social science institutes